The Agricultural Marketing Service (AMS) is an agency of the United States Department of Agriculture; it maintains programs in five commodity areas: cotton and tobacco; dairy; fruit and vegetable; livestock and seed; and poultry.  These programs provide testing, standardization, grading and market news services for those commodities, and oversee marketing agreements and orders, administer research and promotion programs, and purchase commodities for federal food programs.  The AMS enforces certain federal laws such as the Perishable Agricultural Commodities Act and the Federal Seed Act. The AMS budget is $1.2 billion. It is headquartered in the Jamie L. Whitten Building in Washington, D.C. 

As of July 2021, AMS is led by Administrator Bruce Summers.

History
Established in 1939 by Agriculture Secretary Henry A. Wallace (later Vice President) through the merging and consolidation of various United States Department of Agriculture (USDA) bureaus and programs, the Agricultural Marketing Service (AMS) was tasked with facilitating fair and efficient marketing of American agricultural products, including food, fiber, and specialty crops both domestically and internationally.

Most functions of the new Service were later consolidated into the Agricultural Marketing Administration in 1942 before being shifted again several times in the 1940s and 1950s. The agency was once renamed back into the AMS from 1953-1965 before becoming the Consumer and Marketing Service. In April 1972, the current structure of the AMS was officially established under the Department of Agriculture. AMS also began enforcing parts of the 1990 Organic Foods Production Act. Over the decades, AMS grew to also support ranchers, importers, exporters, and other agriculture industry groups.

In 2017, Agriculture Secretary Sonny Perdue shifted several USDA offices, such as the Grain Inspection, Packers, and Stockyards Administration (GIPSA) and several program areas from the Farm Service Agency (FSA), into the Agricultural Marketing Service with the goal of better providing for farmers, ranchers, and producers while improving customer service and efficiency.

Mission
AMS' primary function is to market American agricultural products inside and outside the United States. In addition to this, AMS also funds, administers, and supports agricultural research; grades and certifies the safety of agricultural products; and disseminates information and expertise in the agriculture and agriculture marking industries.

The Livestock and Poultry Program (L&P) supports federal food and nutrition programs like the National School Lunch Program (NSLP).

AMS also enforces the Perishable Agricultural Commodities Act (PACA), Federal Seed Act, Organic Foods Production Act, and Packers and Stockyards Act. The Warehouse and Commodity Management Division of the Fair Trade Practices Program administers United States Warehouse Act and Commodity Credit Corporation storage agreements.

Organization
AMS is led by an administrator assisted by an associate and deputy associate administrator. Currently, these individuals are Administrator Bruce Summers,  Associate Administrator Erin Morris, and Deputy Associate Administrator Lorenzo Tribbett, all longtime AMS employees. Additionally, the Cotton and Tobacco Program is led by a Deputy Administrator and several Associate Deputy Administrators.

Structurally, AMS is headed by the Office of the Administrator; below the Administrator are the Legislative and Regulatory Review Staff, Public Affairs Staff, Civil Rights Staff (within the Office of Civil Rights), and Administrative Management Staff. Beyond that, the AMS is divided into nine programs and one service which are further subdivided into divisions and staffs. AMS' nine programs are: 

 Dairy Program
 Specialty Crops Program
 Fair Trade Practices Program
 Food Disclosure and Labeling Division (FDLD)
 Packers and Stockyards Division (PSD)
 Perishable Agricultural Commodities Act Division (PACA)
 Warehouse and Commodity Management Division (WCMD)
 National Organic Program (NOP)
 Cotton and Tobacco Program (C&T)
 Grading Division
 Standardization and Engineering Division
 Quality Assurance Division
 Market News Division
 Research and Promotion Division
 MRP Laboratory and Scientific IT Support Division
 Administrative Staff
 Livestock and Poultry Program (L&P)
 Transportation and Marketing Program
 Transportation Services Division
 Grants Division
 Marketing Services Division
 USDA Farmers Market
 Science and Technology Program (S&T)
 Laboratory Approval and Testing Division (LATD)
 Monitoring Programs Division (MPD)
 Plant Variety Protection Office (PVPO)
 Seed Regulatory and Testing Division (SRTD)
 Commodity Procurement Program (CP)

The lone service of AMS is:

 Federal Grain Inspection Service (FGIS)

There is also an Information Technology Service (ITS).

Additionally, AMS receives input and counsel from the Advisory Committee on Universal Cotton Standards, Fruit & Vegetable Industry Advisory Committee (FVIAC), Grain Inspection Advisory Committee, National Organic Standards Board (NOSB), and Plant Variety Protection Board.

Programs
The AMS National Organic Program (NOP) develops, implements, and administers national production, handling, and labeling standards for organic agricultural products. The NOP also accredits the certifying agents (foreign and domestic) who inspect organic production and handling operations to certify that they meet USDA standards.

The AMS Science and Technology Program provides scientific support services to the agricultural community and AMS programs, including laboratory analyses, laboratory quality assurance, and coordination of scientific research conducted by other agencies for AMS. In addition, the program's Plant Variety Protection Office administers the Plant Variety Protection Act, by issuing Certificates of Protection for new varieties of plants which are sexually reproduced (by seed) or tuber-propagated.  The program also conducts a program to collect and analyze data about pesticide residue levels in agricultural commodities. It also administers the Pesticide Recordkeeping program, which requires all certified private applicators of federally restricted-use pesticide to maintain records of all applications. The records will be put into a data base to help analyze agricultural pesticide use.

The AMS Transportation and Marketing Program supplies research and technical information regarding the nation's food transportation system to producers, producer groups, shippers, exporters, rural communities, carriers, government agencies and universities. The program also administers a program involving financial grants to States for marketing improvements. In addition, the division assists in the planning and design of marketing facilities, processes, and methods in cooperation with state and local governments, universities, farmer groups, and other segments of the U.S. food industry. This program is intended to enhance the overall effectiveness of the food marketing system, provide better quality products to the consumer at reasonable cost, improve market access for growers with farms of small to medium size, and promote regional economic development.

The AMS administers the commodity checkoff programs.

See also
 Title 7 of the Code of Federal Regulations

References

External links
 Agricultural Marketing Service
 Agricultural Marketing Service in the Federal Register

United States Department of Agriculture agencies
Agricultural marketing in the United States
1939 establishments in the United States
Government agencies established in 1939